"Get 'Em Out by Friday" is a rock epic on the 1972 album Foxtrot by British progressive rock band Genesis, lasting eight and a half minutes. It also appears on their 1973 live album. The lyrics were written by lead singer Peter Gabriel.

Overview 
The song takes the form of a futuristic play set initially in the present but ending in 2012.  Like "Harold the Barrel" and "The Fountain of Salmacis" from their previous album Nursery Cryme, the song's lyrics are split between different characters, with lead singer Peter Gabriel often adapting a different vocal style to each character.

The song uses elements of reality and science fiction as a means of social criticism on the corporate greed and oppression of the UK's private landlords in the 1960s and 1970s, epitomised by Peter Rachman who used "winkling" (a mixture of threats and inducements) to remove tenants on low rents from properties and enable their profitable reletting or redevelopment. Social commentary was an evident theme throughout Genesis's early work, especially in their following album, Selling England by the Pound (1973).

Plot 

The play contains three main characters:
 John Pebble: A business man of Styx Enterprises. Near the end of the song, he has been knighted and works for United Blacksprings International.
 Mark Hall (also known as "The Winkler"): A man who works for Styx Enterprises and has the task of evicting tenants.
 Mrs Barrow: a tenant in a house in Harlow, purchased by Pebble.

The song starts with a fast-paced refrain of Pebble ordering Hall to "Get 'em out by Friday".  In the following verse, the Winkler tells a disbelieving Mrs Barrow that a firm of men has purchased her property and that she has been evicted. She refuses to leave, so Pebble raises the rent on the property. In lieu of this, the Winkler offers £400 for Mrs Barrow to move; she does, albeit grudgingly. Shortly after Mrs Barrow moves in, however, Pebble again raises the rent.

A slow instrumental indicates a passage of time, taking the story to the year 2012. At this time, Genetic Control has announced that they are restricting the height of all humans to four feet.  This piece of news is then discussed in a pub by a man named "Joe Everybody," who reveals the reason behind the restriction: so that Genetic Control, who has recently bought some properties, will be able to accommodate twice as many people in the same tower block.

The penultimate verse is that of Pebble, now knighted, repeating the process for another set of properties. The last verse is a "Memo from Satin Peter",:
With land in your hand, you'll be happy on earth
then invest in the Church for your heaven.

Reception 
Both the song and its accompanying album were generally well-received; Rutherford commented that the lyrics were the best that Gabriel had written while AllMusic cited the song as "the truest sign Genesis has grown muscle without abandoning the whimsy".

In the late seventies, "Get 'Em Out by Friday" was adapted into a comic by French cartoonist Jean Solé. The lyrics were translated by newswriter Alain Dister, and the art includes some additional drawings by famous cartoonist Gotlib. This adaptation was published in the comic magazine Fluide Glacial.

Personnel 
 Peter Gabriel – lead vocals, flute, oboe, bass drum, tambourine
 Tony Banks – Hammond organ, distorted Hohner Pianet, Mellotron, 12-string acoustic guitar
 Steve Hackett – electric and 12-string acoustic guitars
 Mike Rutherford – bass, Dewtron "Mister Bassman" bass pedal synthesizer
 Phil Collins – drums

References 

1972 songs
Genesis (band) songs
Songs written by Peter Gabriel
Songs written by Tony Banks (musician)
Songs written by Phil Collins
Songs written by Steve Hackett
Songs written by Mike Rutherford